Summer Ever is the fourth release, and third full-length LP from The Revolution Smile. The album was an independent release, sold online in physical format and on iTunes and Amazon.

Track list
 "Summer Ever" - 1:12
 "Are You Awake?" - 4:16
 "I Was a Werewolf" - 3:22
 "Ringwald" - 3:17
 "Destination Isolation" - 3:33
 "Maybe, Baby" - 3:17
 "Fate" - 3:55
 "When Love Was Dead" - 4:52
 "Recover" - 4:37
 "Move South" - 1:08
 "The State We're In" - 3:30
 "Positive.Negative" - 2:33
 "Nice Talking to You" - 3:11
 "My Skin Is Thicker Than I Wanted" - 6:19
 "Flight Delay" - 4:13

The Revolution Smile albums
2006 albums